Cyclops varius is a species of copepod from the Cyclopidae family. The scientific name of this species was first published in 1901 by Lilljeborg

References

Animals described in 1901
Cyclopidae